Gornja Gorevnica is a village in the municipality of Čačak, Serbia. According to the 2011 census, the village had a population of 1,299 people.

References

Populated places in Moravica District